Patrik Pasma (born 2 March 2000) is a Finnish racing driver who last competed for Evans Grand Prix in the Formula Regional Asian Championship for Evans Grand Prix.

Career

Formula Ford
Pasma started his single seater career in an array of different Formula Ford categories, mostly in the UK but some in his home country Finland. The Walter Hayes Trophy, Finnish Formula Ford Junior Championship, Champion of Brands and Marcel Albers Memorial Trophy were some of the categories he races in. Pasma's best result was a 2nd place finish in the Marcel Albers Memorial Trophy held at Circuit Zandvoort, he finished behind Irishman Stephen Daly.

British F4
Pasma signed up for his first season in British F4 in 2017 for Carlin alongside Jamie Caroline, Logan Sargeant and Lucas Alecco Roy. 5 points finishes along with 2 podiums saw Pasma have a successful start to the season. However, an extremely serious car crash occurred with the Finn and JHR Developments driver Billy Monger on lap 4 of the 3rd race at the Donington Park. Pasma slowed along the Schwantz Curve that left Monger unsighted and caused him to slam into the back of the Carlin. Monger almost died in the crash, but Pasma was not seriously injured. After a long extraction process to get both drivers out of the cars, it was announced the crash meant Monger had both of his legs amputated while Pasma stayed in the hospital overnight for examinations. He was released without serious injuries. Pasma returned for the next round at Thruxton where he finished 13th in the first race and 7th in the two following, a couple more podiums and a handful of points scoring races saw Pasma end the season in 8th place.

He returned for the 2018 season but jumping ship to Arden International this year. The season got off to an okay start as he battled Johnathan Hoggard for the lead of the second race and crossed the line 2nd to get his first podium of the year however both himself and Brit jumped the start meaning they finished 5th and 6th respectively, Sebastian Priaulx took the victory. His first podium eventually came as he once again battled Johnathan Hoggard who beat him off the line from pole in the final race at Donington, a safety car caused late pressure from Kiern Jewiss however the Finn crossed the line second. Pasma won the first race of his career at the first race Rockingham where he dominated the field getting Pole, the fastest lap and the race victory ahead of Red Bull duo Hauger and Doohan. Pasma finished the season with 2 wins, 11 podiums and 315 which placed him in 6th position.

MRF Challenge
Pasma was the only Finn on the grid in 2018-19 for the MRF Challenge. For the second time that weekend, Pasma took reverse grid pole at the 4th race in Dubai to which he converted into his first of 3 wins, Belgian Max Defourny put pressure on Pasma but fell short by half a second in the end. Pasma finished on the podium at least one in all 3 rounds, the most being 3 podiums in Bahrain where he stepped on every step of the podium. Pasma fell short of the title by 94 points, three time W Series champion Jamie Chadwick won the title, followed by Defourny.

Formula Renault Eurocup 
For 2019 Pasma moved into the Formula Renault Eurocup with Arden. Partnering Frank Bird and Sebastián Fernández, Pasma scored a sole podium at the Nürburgring and ended up eleventh in the standings.

Formula Regional

2020 
The Finn switched to KIC Motorsport to race in the Formula Regional European Championship in 2020. After a relatively weak first half of the season in which he had only managed to achieve one podium finish, Pasma came alive in the second half and took four race wins, climbing to fourth in the standings and being the highest-placed driver to not have driven for the Prema Powerteam.

2021 

At the beginning of 2021 Pasma took part in the F3 Asian winter series with Evans GP. Following another sub-par first half of the year the Finn experienced a streak of five podiums in the final five races, which included two victories, which promoted him up to fourth in the standings.

Pasma remained with KIC in Formula Regional European for 2021. However, after Thomas ten Brinke's surprise retirement from racing following the round at Zandvoort, Pasma replaced the Dutchman at ART Grand Prix. He finished twelfth in the standings, having experienced mixed fortunes with both teams.

2022 
In the winter of 2022 Pasma returned to Evans GP to race in the final three rounds of Formula Regional Asia. He won the reversed-grid race at the Dubai Autodrome in the penultimate round and ended the campaign in eleventh.

FIA Formula 3 Championship 
Pasma made his Formula 3 debut in March 2022, when he took part in the pre-season test with Jenzer Motorsport.

Karting record

Karting career summary

Racing record

Racing career summary 

* Season still in progress.

Complete F4 British Championship results
(key) (Races in bold indicate pole position) (Races in italics indicate fastest lap)

Complete Formula Renault Eurocup results
(key) (Races in bold indicate pole position) (Races in italics indicate fastest lap)

Complete Formula Regional European Championship results 
(key) (Races in bold indicate pole position) (Races in italics indicate fastest lap)

* Season still in progress.

Complete Formula Regional Asian Championship results
(key) (Races in bold indicate pole position) (Races in italics indicate fastest lap)

References

External links 
 
 

2000 births
Living people
Finnish racing drivers
Formula Regional Asian Championship drivers
Formula Regional European Championship drivers
F3 Asian Championship drivers
Carlin racing drivers
Arden International drivers
ART Grand Prix drivers
Sportspeople from Oulu
British F4 Championship drivers
Formula Ford drivers
MRF Challenge Formula 2000 Championship drivers
Formula Renault Eurocup drivers
KIC Motorsport drivers
Karting World Championship drivers
UAE F4 Championship drivers